Montaner is a commune in the Pyrénées-Atlantiques department, France.

Montaner may also refer to:

Places
Montaner, Italy, in the region of Veneto

People
Alejandro Montaner, Venezuelan singer and son of singer Ricardo Montaner
Concepción Montaner (born 1981), Spanish long jumper
Francisco "Paquito" Montaner (1894–1945), Puerto Rican baseball player
Julio Montaner (born 1956), Argentinean-Canadian physician, professor and researcher
Luis Montaner, American medical researcher
Martha Montaner (1955–2016), Uruguayan politician
Ricardo Montaner (born 1957), Venezuelan singer-songwriter
Rita Montaner (1900–1958), Cuban singer, pianist and actress
Vinci Montaner (born 1976), Filipino singer with the band Parokya ni Edgar

Music
Ricardo Montaner (album), 1987

See also
Schism of Montaner, 1967–1969, in Montaner, Italy
Lluís Domènech i Montaner (1850–1923), Spanish Catalan architect
Lluís Domènech i Montaner House-Museum
Château de Montaner, a castle in the commune of Montaner
Estadio Francisco Montaner, a multi-use stadium in Ponce, Puerto Rico